Olmes Fernando García Flórez (born 21 October 1992) is a Colombian footballer who plays as a forward for Deportes Quindio.

Club career
The Choco native began his career in the youth ranks of Deportes Quindio. In 2011, he made his debut in the Colombian First Division. In his first year with the club the young Colombian made 14 league appearances and scored two goals. In 2012, he made 33 league appearances for Quindio and scored five goals.

On 21 February 2013, García signed a contract with Real Salt Lake in Major League Soccer after being sold to the American side.  He scored his first goal for Salt Lake in an away game in Vancouver on 13 April.

García was released by Salt Lake at the end of the 2016 season, but was selected by San Jose Earthquakes in the 2016 MLS Re-Entry Draft Stage 2. He subsequently joined América de Cali in his home country.

On 24 January 2018, García was loaned to Spanish Segunda División side Real Oviedo for six months.

References

External links
 
 
 

1992 births
Living people
Footballers from Barranquilla
Colombian footballers
Association football forwards
Categoría Primera A players
Deportes Quindío footballers
América de Cali footballers
Major League Soccer players
USL Championship players
Real Salt Lake players
Real Monarchs players
Real Oviedo players
Jaguares de Córdoba footballers
Colombian expatriate footballers
Colombian expatriate sportspeople in the United States
Colombian expatriate sportspeople in Spain
Expatriate soccer players in the United States
Expatriate footballers in Spain